The Western Argus was a newspaper published in Kalgoorlie, Western Australia, between 1894 and 1938.

It had three different names over time:
 Western Argus, 1894-1896
 Kalgoorlie Western Argus, 1896-1916
 Western Argus, 1916-1938

It was brought by Hocking & Co. Ltd. in 1896.

It was a weekly and had offices in the same building as the Kalgoorlie Miner on Hannan Street. It was promoted in the Kalgoorlie Miner as well.

See also
 Coolgardie Miner

References

External links

Further reading
 Kirwan, John, (1949) The story of a Goldfields newspaper : a romance of the press : Kalgoorlie early days. Journal and proceedings Western Australian Historical Society : 1949), Vol. IV Pt. I (1949)

Publications established in 1894
Defunct newspapers published in Western Australia
1894 establishments in Australia
Publications disestablished in 1938
City of Kalgoorlie–Boulder
Newspapers published in Goldfields-Esperance